Priore is a surname, and may refer to:
 Antoine Prioré (1912–1983), scientist
 Chuck Priore, American football coach
 Domenic Priore (born 1960), American author and television producer
  (born 1978), German composer
 Mary del Priore (born 1952), American historian
 Michael Del Priore (1954-2020), American painter
 Nicolás Del Priore (1996), Argentine footballer
 Ray Priore (born 1963), American football coach